Prosper High School is a class 6A public high school in Prosper, Texas, United States. It is part of Prosper Independent School District located in western Collin County, with a small portion of the district extending into Denton County. In addition to Prosper, the district serves a portion of McKinney and small parts of Frisco and Celina.

History 
The 2009–2010 school year began in a brand new building. In 2015, the school was rated "Met Standard" by the Texas Education Agency.

In September 2015, then-principal Greg Wright created controversy for the school and the Prosper School District, as reported in the Dallas Morning News, when it was revealed he criticized a faculty member that reported a teacher from PHS to the Police for inappropriately touching a student.

In 2018, two editorials were removed from Prosper High School's student newspaper. The students claimed that they would be censored if they published anything perceived to criticize the school. The Student Press Law Center sent a letter to the Superintendent of Prosper Independent School District, urging them to remediate the school principal's "hijacking and censorship" of the student newspaper.

Athletics
The Prosper Eagles compete in the following sports:

 Baseball
 Basketball
 Cross Country
 Football
 Golf
 Powerlifting
 Soccer
 Softball
 Swimming and Diving
 Water Polo
 Tennis
 Track & Field
 Volleyball
 Wrestling
For the 2022-23 season, Prosper High School competes in UIL 6A Region 1 - District 5. The other schools in that district are Allen High School, Denton Braswell High School, Denton Guyer High School, Little Elm High School, McKinney High School, McKinney Boyd High School and Rock Hill High School.

In 2010, Prosper introduced hockey as a club sport.

Prior to the 2006–07 school year, PHS competed in UIL Class 2A. PHS moved up to 3A for Fall 2006. For Fall 2012, PHS was set to become a 4A school for the first time. However, UIL added a new classification for low-enrollment schools, turning Class 4A into Class 5A. With PHS's enrollment of 2110 in October 2015, it was one of the largest schools in Class 5A (schools 1100-2049 students) for the 2016–17 and 2017-18 seasons. PHS moved into Class 6A for the first time in Fall 2018.

State titles
Baseball
1984 (1A)
2015 (5A)
Football
2008 (3A/D1)
Boys Golf
2011 (3A)
 Volleyball
 2017 (5A)

In the 2017-2018 school year, Prosper High School won the 5A UIL Lone Star Cup, awarded annually based on a school's performance in district and state championships.

Although not recognized by the UIL, Prosper High School competes in Lacrosse, in which they won a state title in May 2019.

On the individual level, many athletes have won athletic state titles, including the following:

 Gabe Costa (5A Boys Wrestling 120lbs, 2016)
 Tommy Flaherty (5A Boys Wrestling 160lbs, 2018)
Rylan Bonds (6A Boys Wrestling 220lbs, 2020)
 John Richardson (6A Boys Wrestling 160lbs, 2021)
 Aubrey O'Connell (6A Cross Country, 2019)
 Bailey Belvis (3A Cross Country, 2007 and 2008), (3A Track and Field 1600 meters, 2009)
 Kim Castleberry (3A Track and Field 400 meters, 2008)
 Cole Knuth (3A Track and Field Discus, 2007)

Clubs and organizations
In addition to athletics, Prosper High School competes in:

 Marching Band
 Theatre
 One Act Play
 Choir
 Speech and Debate
 Esports
 Academic Competition
 Color Guard
 Drill Team

Prosper High School hosts local chapters of:

 Future Farmers of America (FFA)
 National Honor Society (NHS)
 Interact Club

Some of Prosper High School's clubs include, but are not limited to:

 Genders and Sexualities Alliance (GSA) club
 Psychology club
 Gaming club
 Rock climbing club

Notable alumni
Davis Webb, NFL quarterback for the Buffalo Bills.
Ben Banogu, NFL defensive end for the Indianapolis Colts.
Tyler Toney, former quarterback, and current YouTuber for web group Dude Perfect.
Cade York, current NFL placekicker for the Cleveland Browns, and CFP national champion (2019)

References

External links

High schools in Collin County, Texas
Public high schools in Texas